The Church of the Holy Spirit is a Roman Catholic parish in Stamford, Connecticut, part of the  Diocese of Bridgeport.

History
The modern church with some Romanesque features was designed by Antinozzi Associates of Bridgeport, CT.

References

External links 
 Diocese of Bridgeport
 Parish website

Roman Catholic churches in Stamford, Connecticut
Romanesque Revival church buildings in Connecticut
Roman Catholic Diocese of Bridgeport